Hayrünnisa Gül (née Özyurt, born August 18, 1965) is the 11th First Lady of Turkey, as the wife of Abdullah Gül.

First Lady of Turkey 
On October 7, 2010, Gül became the first First Lady to address the Parliamentary Assembly of the Council of Europe (PACE) on issues faced by children and women.

Gül has also publicly spoken out against the imposition of the head scarf in Islamic countries upon young females who cannot make judgment for themselves.

After seven years, on August 28, 2014, she left her office as first lady when Recep Tayyip Erdoğan became president. Afterward, she publicly responded to criticism in regards to her husband, saying she would start a "real intifada."

Personal life 
Gül has two sons namely Ahmed Münir and Mehmed Emre and one daughter, Kübra.

Awards and decorations
2012: Grand Cross of the Order of the Crown (Netherlands)

References 

1965 births
Living people
20th-century Turkish women
First Ladies of Turkey
People from Istanbul
Grand Crosses of the Order of the Crown (Netherlands)
Turkish Sunni Muslims
21st-century Turkish women